Rybka (which means "little fish" in many Slavic languages) may refer to:
Rybka, a chess computer program
Rybka Lututowska, a village in Poland
Rybka Sokolska, a village in Poland
Rybka (film), a 2007 Russian animated film
Rybka (surname)

See also